Polo-Cockta (sometimes written as 'Polo Cockta' or 'Polo-Cocta') is a Polish Coca-Cola-like drink introduced in the 1970s. Polo-Cockta was introduced as a substitute for the original Coca-Cola, which was unavailable in Polish shops due to limited imports from the US to soviet bloc countries. At first it was based on Cockta, a very popular drink from Slovenia (then Yugoslavia).

Polo-Cockta was discontinued during the 1980s, but has been revived for a few years by a private company Zbyszko which acquired all the rights to the brand, reacting to the ever-popular demand for PRL-stylised products, an element of "PRL nostalgia". The taste of Polo-Cockta is sometimes described as a mixture of Coca-Cola and Pepsi.

For a while Polo-Cockta was renamed Polo Cola, without change to the product. However, in 2016, Polo Cola was renamed back to Polo-Cockta.

Polo-Cockta has made a significant appearance in the Polish film Kingsajz by Juliusz Machulski, where it was a major plot device.

External links
 Polo-Cockta on its manufacturer's website

References

Cola-like brands
PRL nostalgia
Polish brands
Products introduced in 1970
Soft drinks manufacturers